Ratko Glavina (born 1 December 1941) is a Croatian actor.

Filmography

Television roles 
 "Ruža vjetrova" as Jure Jelavić (2011-2012)
 "Novo doba" (2002)
 "Nepokoreni grad" (1982)
 "Velo misto" (1981)
 "Naše malo misto" (1970)

Filmske uloge 
 "Posljednja volja" as Bepo Štambuk (restaurant) (2001)
 "Katarina Druga" (1987)
 "Povratak" (1979)
 "Đovani" as Giovanni (1976)
 "Djevojka i hrast" (1955)

External links

1941 births
Living people
21st-century Croatian male actors
Croatian male stage actors
Croatian male television actors
Croatian male film actors
Actors from Split, Croatia
20th-century Croatian male actors